Ty Uchaf Farmhouse, Llanelly, Monmouthshire is a farmhouse in the west of the county dating from the early 17th century. Located 0.5km north-west of the Church of St Elli, it is a Grade II* listed building.

History
The farmhouse dates from the early 17th century, with a large wing added in the mid-17th century. A later block was added at the end of the 17th, or the beginning of the 18th century. A map of 1847 shows the farmhouse in the occupation of James Davies, who was farming 76 acres.

Architecture and description
The farmhouse is of stone and the chimneystack in the later block indicates that the upper parlour had a fireplace, which is unusual for a building of this date and location. The farmhouse is listed Grade II*. The external kitchen, dated 1697, and the barn range have their own Grade II listings.

Notes

References 
 

Grade II* listed buildings in Monmouthshire
Farmhouses in Wales
Grade II* listed houses in Wales
Houses completed in the 17th century
Grade II listed barns